Northwestern High School is a public high school near Springfield, Ohio. It is the only high school in the Northwestern Local Schools district.

History 
The school itself is a 1948 consolidation of North Hampton and Lawrenceville high schools, deriving its name from the northwest portion of Clark County.  Accordingly, the school serves the residents of North Hampton and Lawrenceville as well as the villages of Tremont City, Dialton and Upper Fox Hollow, and adjacent rural areas in Pike and German Townships.

The district opened two new school buildings, an elementary and a high school, in the fall of 2013.  All remaining buildings were demolished, and the middle school ceased to exist. In 2018, the district has opened a new Athletic Complex near its stadium.

The Ohio High School Athletic Association State Championships 
 Girls' volleyball – 1983, 1984, 1986, 1987 
 Boys' basketball - 1933* 
 * won by Lawrenceville High School prior to consolidation into Northwestern

References

External links
 District website

High schools in Clark County, Ohio
Public high schools in Ohio